Richard "Dick" E. Longshore (born March 21, 1926 in Arkansas City, Kansas - died June 8, 1988 in Sacramento, California) was an American Navy veteran of World War II and both Korean and Vietnam Wars. He was also a California politician and a member of the Republican Party.

He first ran for the California State Assembly in 1982 against Democratic incumbent Richard H. Robinson, who had held the Orange County-based 72nd district since 1974. Although Longshore managed just 43.8% of the vote, he didn't give up. He ran against Robinson again in 1984 and this time, with Ronald Reagan at the top of the ticket, scored 49.8% of the vote.

From 1984 to 1986 he served as a member of the State Veterans' Board.

By the time Longshore ran again in 1986, Robinson had decided to make what would turn out to be an unsuccessful run for Congress against then Rep. Bob Dornan (R-Santa Ana).

In the race for Robinson's now open assembly seat Longshore defeated the Democratic candidate, then Santa Ana mayor Daniel E. Griset by just over 10 points.

In 1988, one day after winning the Republican primary for reelection, Longshore died from complications of pneumonia. This allowed the Orange County Republican Central Committee to name a replacement candidate, and they chose 29-year old Curt Pringle, an elected member of the committee.  Pringle went on to narrowly win the seat against Democrat Christian Thierbach, a deputy district attorney from Riverside county.

Electoral history

References

External links
Dick Longshore

1926 births
1988 deaths
20th-century American politicians
Republican Party members of the California State Assembly
United States Navy personnel of World War II
United States Navy personnel of the Korean War
United States Navy personnel of the Vietnam War